Ronald Joseph Arculli, GBM, GBS, CVO, OBE, JP (born 2 January 1939 in Hong Kong) is former chairman of Hong Kong Exchanges and Clearing, Non-official Members Convenor of the Executive Council of Hong Kong (Exco) and a senior partner at King & Wood Mallesons. He is a Hong Kong solicitor and a founding partner of the law firm, Arculli, Fong, & Ng, which later merged with King & Wood Mallesons.

Early life
Arculli was born to an Indian father and a Chinese mother. His parents divorced when he was three. He was sent to study in England and finished his A-levels in 1958. After this he returned to Hong Kong and eventually became a barrister and solicitor in both the bars of Hong Kong and England.

Career
Arculli was a member of the Legislative Council of Hong Kong and the deputy chairman of the Liberal Party. He is also a member of the board of directors of the Asia Art Archive and the former chairman of the Hong Kong Jockey Club. Among his current responsibilities, he is currently a senior partner with King & Wood Mallesons.

Arculli has been a non-official member of Exco since 2005 and was made Non-official Members Convenor in October 2011 following the resignation of CY Leung to stand in the 2012 Hong Kong Chief Executive election. He has also been inducted as Honorary Fellow of Hong Kong Securities and Investment Institute (HKSI)  on 24 October 2013. In 2013, he was also appointed as the chairman of Richard Li Tzar-kai new venture, FWD.

Personal life
Arculli speaks English and Cantonese (but cannot read or write Chinese).

With his Austrian-born wife Joanne, he has three children. He also has two children from a previous marriage, Derek and Kim Arculli, and three grandchildren: Jasmin, Jake, and Toby Arculli. His brother-in-law (married to his sister Rhoda Arculli) is his stockbroker and the brother of Court of Final Appeal judge Kemal Bokhary. From 2002-06 Arculli served as Chairman of the Hong Kong Jockey Club.

References

External links
Ronald Arculli biodata
Ronald Arculli Profile at King & Wood

1939 births
Living people
Commanders of the Royal Victorian Order
Solicitors of Hong Kong
Officers of the Order of the British Empire
Members of Lincoln's Inn
Hong Kong financial businesspeople
Liberal Party (Hong Kong) politicians
Hong Kong people of Indian descent
Recipients of the Gold Bauhinia Star
Recipients of the Grand Bauhinia Medal
Members of the Provisional Legislative Council
Barristers of Hong Kong
HK LegCo Members 1988–1991
HK LegCo Members 1991–1995
HK LegCo Members 1995–1997
HK LegCo Members 1998–2000
Members of the Selection Committee of Hong Kong